Pearls of the Deep is a 1966 Czechoslovak anthology film directed by Jiří Menzel, Jan Němec, Evald Schorm, Věra Chytilová and Jaromil Jireš. The five segments are all based on short stories by Bohumil Hrabal. The film was released in Czechoslovakia on 7 January 1966.

The film was received as a manifesto for the new generation of Czechoslovak filmmakers, and thus became closely associated with the Czechoslovak New Wave.

Plot
 The Death of Mr Balthazar (Smrt pana Baltazara), directed by Jiří Menzel - A couple take their elderly father to watch the motorcycle races. The wife has perfect pitch and can identify motorcycles by the sound of their engine. They all get very drunk and meet a man who lost his legs in a motorcycle accident. Together they discuss the deaths of their favorite motorcyclists in auto accidents. The race begins and a motorcyclist named Balthazar crashes and dies. The man with no legs remarks he hates how that always happens near him when he goes to a motorcycling event. The couple and their father leave and the father discusses his favorite beer manufactured in Munich.
 Imposters (Podvodníci), directed by Jan Němec- Two old men who are about to die construct false biographies for themselves. One man claims to have been a successful opera singer and the other a successful journalist.
 House of Joy (Dům radosti), directed by Evald Schorm - Two insurance agents visit an eccentric painter and goat farmer and his mother.
 At the World Cafeteria (Automat Svět), directed by Věra Chytilová- A wedding reception takes place at a diner. The guests are able to stay oblivious of the surrounding misery.
 Romance, directed by Jaromil Jireš - A working-class boy becomes infatuated with a Roma girl.

Cast

"The Death of Mr Balthazar"
 Pavla Marsálková as Matka
 Ferdinand Krůta as Otec František
 Alois Vachek as Mrzák
 Emil Iserle as Stryc
 Miroslav Nohýnek as Chlapec
 Vlasta Spánková as Dívka
 Jiří Menzel as Bicyclist

"Imposters"
 Miloš Čtrnáctý as Zpěvák
 František Havel as Novinář
 Josef Hejl as Holič
 Jan Vašák as Zřízenec
 Jiří Reichl as Boy with fracture

"House of Joy"
 Josefa Pechlatová as Matka
 Václav Žák as Malíř
 Ivan Vyskočil as Uředník
 Antonín Pokorny as Uředník

"At the World Cafeteria"
 Věra Mrázková as Nevesta
 Vladimír Boudník as Vytvarník
 Alžběta Laštovková as Výčepní
 Václav Chochola as SNB
 Jan Vala as Cock
 Aleš Košnar as Mládenec
 Bohumil Hrabal as Bohumil Hrabal

"Romance"
 Dana Valtová as Gypsy girl
 Ivan Vyskočil as Gaston
 Karel Jeřábek as Hlídač
 František Příhoda as Watcher

The Junk Shop
Juraj Herz originally made his short film The Junk Shop to be included in this movie, but it was omitted due to the running time.

References

External links
 Pearls of the Deep at The Criterion Collection
 Pearls of the Deep at IMDb
 
 

1966 drama films
1966 films
Czechoslovak drama films
1960s Czech-language films
Films based on short fiction
Films based on works by Bohumil Hrabal
Films directed by Jiří Menzel
Films directed by Jan Němec
Films directed by Evald Schorm
Films directed by Věra Chytilová
Films directed by Jaromil Jireš
Czech anthology films